Pear Cider and Cigarettes  is a 2016 Canadian animated short film written and directed by Robert Valley and produced by Cara Speller. The film and the graphic novel of the same name are based on a true story.

Plot
Hard-living Techno Stypes has been Robert's best friend since childhood, and over the years, Robert has been amazed by Techno's ability to sabotage himself. When Techno is hospitalized in China and needs a liver transplant, Robert goes on a wild ride to get him home to Vancouver.

Accolades

See also
Alcoholism
Drug addiction

References

External links
  
 
 Trailer

2016 3D films
2016 films
2010s animated short films
Canadian animated short films
British animated short films
Crowdfunded films
Films set in Guangzhou
Films set in Vancouver
3D short films
Films based on Canadian comics
Animated films based on comics
Kickstarter-funded films
Films set in China
2010s English-language films
2010s Canadian films
2010s British films